Norman J. Sauer is an American forensic anthropologist and professor emeritus of anthropology at Michigan State University (MSU).

Education
Sauer received his undergraduate degree from the State University of New York at Geneseo and his Ph.D. from Michigan State University.

Career
Sauer taught in the department of anthropology at MSU from 1974 to 2012. While at MSU, he co-directed their forensic anthropology track of the Forensic Science Program, and directed their Forensic Anthropology Laboratory. He retired from MSU in 2013. In 2015, he was named vice president of the American Academy of Forensic Sciences.

Work and views
In the 2000s, Sauer identified a 200-year-old mummy that had previously been posted for sale on eBay as belonging to the University of Maryland School of Medicine. It was returned there in 2011. He has also analyzed the famous photograph V-J Day in Times Square and has concluded that the sailor depicted therein is George Mendonsa (who has claimed to be this sailor). He has argued that race is an invalid method of classifying humans.

References

American forensic scientists
American anthropologists
Michigan State University faculty
Living people
Michigan State University alumni
Forensic anthropologists
State University of New York at Geneseo alumni
People from Williamston, Michigan
Year of birth missing (living people)